ENS Vapper (PVL-111) is a , the lead and currently the only ship of her class of the Estonian Border Guard.

History

References

Ships built in Estonia
2000 ships